Zavosht (also Romanized as Zāvosht) is a village in Benajuy-ye Shomali Rural District of the Central District of Bonab County, East Azerbaijan province, Iran. At the 2006 census, its population was 3,802 in 936 households. The following census in 2011 counted 3,968 people in 1,140 households. The latest census in 2016 showed a population of 4,539 people in 1,406 households; it was the largest village in its rural district.

References 

Bonab County

Populated places in East Azerbaijan Province

Populated places in Bonab County